Luleå University of Technology is a Public Research University in Norrbotten County, Sweden. The university has four campuses located in the Arctic Region in the cities of Luleå, Kiruna, Skellefteå, and Piteå.

With more than 19,000 students and about 1,500 employees, Luleå University of Technology is a middle-sized academic institution in Sweden and Scandinavia's northernmost Institute of Technology.

Luleå University of Technology is consistently ranked among the world's top universities, especially in Mining Science, Materials Science, Engineering, Computer Science, Robotics, and Space Science. The university is famous for its groundbreaking collaborations with various industry partners, such as LKAB, Ericsson, Boliden, ABB, and Epiroc, and its high amount of externally funded research.

The university was originally established in 1971 under the name Luleå University College and had its first campus in the suburbs of Porsön in Luleå. But was a couple of years later merged with the Teacher's Training College of Luleå and the School of Music of Piteå. In 1997, the institution was granted full university status by the Swedish government and became then thereafter renamed as Luleå University of Technology.

Areas of education and research 
Luleå University of Technology conduct mainly applied research in close collaboration with international and national companies, but does also have over 100 educational programs. With regards to research and education, Luleå University of Technology is active in the following areas.

See also
 List of universities in Sweden
 List of forestry universities and colleges
 Piteå School of Music

Notes and references

 
Norrbotten
Piteå
Kiruna
Technical universities and colleges in Sweden
Educational institutions established in 1971
Buildings and structures in Norrbotten County
1971 establishments in Sweden